The history of South Sudan comprises the history of the territory of present-day South Sudan and the peoples inhabiting the region.

South Sudan seceded from the Republic of Sudan in 2011.
Geographically, South Sudan is not part of the Sudan region at all (the Sahel), forming as it does part of Sub-Saharan Africa. In modern terminology, it does, however, include parts of the East Sudanian Savanna. 
Its inclusion in "Sudan" is due to the southward expansion of the Ottoman Khedivate of Egypt in the 19th century, and its consequent inclusion in Mahdist Sudan, Anglo-Egyptian Sudan and the Republic of Sudan during 1885 to 2011.

South Sudan is mostly inhabited by Nilo-Saharan speaking peoples, with   Niger-Congo speaking minorities.
Historically, what is now South Sudan was dominated by Central Sudanic speaking peoples, but the presence of Nilotic peoples can be assumed from prehistoric times as well. Since about the 14th century, following the  collapse of the Christian Nubian kingdoms of Makuria and Alodia, the Nilotic peoples gradually came to dominate the region.

Early history

Roman Expedition
For many years the Sudd Marsh, and especially its thicket of vegetation, proved an impenetrable barrier to navigation along the Nile. In 61 AD, a party of Roman soldiers sent by Emperor Nero proceeded up the White Nile but were not able to get beyond the Sudd, which marked the limit of Roman penetration into equatorial Africa. For the same reasons in later times the search for the source of the Nile was particularly difficult; it eventually involved overland expeditions from the central African coast, so as to avoid having to travel through the Sudd.

Nilotic expansion out of the Sudd

Linguistic evidence shows that over time Nilotic speakers, such as the Dinka, Shilluk, and Luo, took over. These groups spread from the Sudd marshlands, where archaeological evidence shows that a culture based on transhumant cattle raising had been present since 3000 BCE, and the Nilotic culture in that area may thus be continuous to that date. Archaeological evidence, as well as the physical evidence in the livelihood of the Nilotes including their dome-shaped houses and tukuls, shows that they may have made an enormous contribution to the governance and wealth of the Nubia Kingdom before and during the 25th Dynasty.

The Nilotic expansion from the Sudd Marshes into the rest of South Sudan seems to have begun in the 14th century. This coincides with the collapse of the Christian Nubian kingdoms of Makuria and Alodia and the penetration of Arab traders into central Sudan. From the Arabs, the South Sudanese may have obtained new breeds of humpless cattle. Archaeologist Roland Oliver notes that the period also shows an Iron Age beginning among the Nilotics. These factors may explain how the Nilotic speakers expanded to dominate the region.

Central Sudanic Presence

Until about 1500 vast parts of South Sudan were controlled by speakers of Central Sudanic languages. A few Central Sudanic groups remain such as the Madi and the Moru.

Shilluk

By the sixteenth century, the most powerful group among the Nilotic speakers were Shilluk, who spread east to the banks of the white Nile under the legendary leadership of Nyikang, who is said to have ruled the Shilluk c.1490 to c.1517. The Shilluk gained control of the west bank of the river as far north as Kosti in Sudan. There they established an economy based on cereal farming and fishing, with permanent settlements located along the length of the river. The Shilluk developed an intensive system of agriculture, and the Shilluk lands in the 17th century had a population density similar to that of the Egyptian Nile lands.

One theory is that it was pressure from the Shilluk that drove the Funj people north, who would establish the Sultanate of Sennar.
The Dinka remained in the Sudd area, maintaining their transhumance economy.

While the Dinka were protected and isolated from their neighbors, the Shilluk were more involved in international affairs. The Shilluk controlled the west bank of the White Nile, but the other side was controlled by the Funj Sultanate, and there was a regular conflict between the two. The Shilluk had the ability to quickly raid outside areas by war canoe and had control of the waters of the Nile. The Funj had a standing army of armored cavalry, and this force allowed them to dominated the plains of the sahel.

Shilluk traditions tell of King Odak Ocollo who ruled c. 1630 and led them in a three-decade war with Sennar over control of the White Nile trade routes. The Shilluk allied with the Sultanate of Darfur and the Kingdom of Takali against the Funj, but the capitulation of Takali ended the war in the Funj's favor. In the later 17th century the Shilluk and Funj allied against the Jieng, a group of Dinka who rose to power in the border area between the Funj and Shilluk. The Shilluk political structure gradually centralized under a king or reth. The most important is Reth Tugo who ruled c. 1690 to 1710 and established the Shilluk capital of Fashoda. The same period saw the gradual collapse of the Funj sultanate, leaving the Shilluk in complete control of the White Nile and its trade routes. The Shilluk military power was based on control of the river.

Azande
The non-Nilotic Azande people, who entered southern Sudan in the 16th century, established the region's largest state. The Azande are the third largest nationality in Southern Sudan. They are found in Maridi, Iba, Yambio, Nzara, Ezon, Tambura and Nagere Counties in the tropical rain forest belt of western Equatoria and Bahr el Ghazal. In the 18th century, the Avongara people entered and quickly imposed their authority over the Azande. Avongara power remained largely unchallenged until the arrival of the British at the end of the 19th century.

The Azande developed kingdoms dominated by families of Avongara aristocrats that enacted assimilationist policies that were built on the strength of converting conquered peoples into subjects of the king and noble class. This was done through a system of conscription that allowed for the king's subjects to be conscripted as soldiers in regiments, or as cultivators that allowed for food surplus that enabled redistribution for those that needed it. The Zande kingdoms used trial by ordeal as a means of assessing guilt or innocence when administering justice and law through the use of a poison that was used as a oracle. Dynastic succession under the Zande was a complicated system in which the sons of kings would be given frontier provinces of the kingdom, which allowed for princes to expand their holdings and project authority outwards, creating their own kingdoms. These conquests would lead to the incorporation of Sudanic, Bantu, and Nilotic elements within their kingdoms that were further assimilated via adoption of the Zande language, these kingdoms would span from what is now known as the modern Central African republic, to the Democratic Republic of the Congo, to modern South Sudan.

Geographical barriers protected the southerners from Islam's advance, enabling them to retain their social and cultural heritage and their political and religious institutions. The Dinka people were especially secure in the Sudd marshlands, which protected them from outside interference, and allowed them to remain secure without a large armed forces. The Shilluk, Azande, and Bari people had more regular conflicts with neighbouring states.

19th century

Turko-Egyptian conquest under the Muhammad Ali Dynasty

In 1821 the Sennar Sultanate to the north collapsed in the face of an invasion by Egypt under the Ottoman Muhammad Ali Dynasty. The Turko-Egyptian forces then began to foray southward after consolidating their control over the northerly territories of Darfur, Kurdufan, and Funjistan. In 1827 Ali Khurshid Pasha led a force through the Dinka lands and in 1830 led an expedition to the junction of the White Nile and the Sobat. The most successful missions were led by Admiral Salim Qabudan who between 1839 and 1842 sailed the White Nile, reaching as far south as modern-day Juba.

The Turko-Egyptian forces attempted to set up forts and garrisons in the region, but disease and defection forced their quick abandonment. While claimed by the Ottoman Khedives of Egypt, they could not exert any real authority over the region. In 1851, under pressure from foreign powers, the government of Egypt opened the region to European merchants and missionaries.

The Europeans found a large supply of ivory, but found the local Bari had little interest in anything they were selling. As a result, the merchants often turned to force, seizing the ivory, even this proved not to be economical and the merchant ventures had little success. Christian missionaries also established posts in the region, with the Catholic Apostolic Vicariate of Central Africa, that dotted the landscape. The missionaries also had little impact on the region in the early 19th century.

Al-Zubayr's trading empire

The lack of formal authority was filled in the 1850s by a set of powerful merchant princes. In the east Muhammad Ahmad al-Aqqad controlled much land, but the most powerful was Al-Zubayr Rahma Mansur who came to control the Bahr el Ghazal and other parts of South Sudan. Al-Zubayr was a merchant from Khartoum, who hired his own private army and marched south.

He set up a network of trading forts known as zaribas through the region, and from these forts controlled local trade. The most valuable commodity was ivory. In previous centuries Sudanese merchants had not placed a high price on ivory, but the period of Egyptian rule coincided with a great increase in global demand as middle class Americans and Europeans began to purchase pianos and billiard balls.

To manage the trade al-Zubayr needed labour, and thus also began to capture a significant number of slaves. To his mercenary force, he also conscripted a large slave army. Due to trade disputes with the Sultanate of Darfur, al-Zubayr went to war against that kingdom and in 1874 defeated their forces and killed Ibrahim, the last Fur Sultan.

Equatoria

The Ottoman Khedive of Egypt, Isma'il Pasha, was concerned over the growing power of al-Zubayr, and established the province of Equatoria and planned to colonize the area. Isma'il hired the British explorer Samuel Baker in 1869 to govern the area, and supplied him with soldiers and generous financing, but Baker was unable to extend Turko-Egyptian power over the area.

To dispose of Al-Zubayr, Isma'il Pasha dispatched the mercenary leader Muhammad al-Bulalwi and promised him the governorship of Bahr el Ghazal, if he defeated al-Zubayr. Instead, al-Zubayr routed the invaders and killed al-Bulalwi. In 1873, Isma'il Pasha thus agreed to appoint al-Zubayr as Ottoman governor and declared him al-Zubayr Rahma Mansur Pasha.

Isma'il was still threatened by al-Zubayr and his independent base of power. The British media was also filled with stories about al-Zubayr the "Slaver King."  In 1874 Charles George Gordon was appointed the governor of Equatoria. In 1877 al-Zubayr traveled to Cairo to ask for the governorship of Darfur as well but was placed under house arrest by Is'mail. Gordon defeated al-Zubayr's son, ending the merchants' control of the region. Despite this, Gordon still failed to exert authority over any territory in the region beyond the lands immediately around his few forts.

In 1878, Gordon was replaced by Emin Pasha (Eduard Schnitzer). The Mahdist Revolt did not spread south to the non-Muslim areas, but cut off southern Sudan from Egypt, leaving Emin Pasha isolated and without resources. He was rescued by the Emin Pasha Relief Expedition led by Henry Morton Stanley.

Equatoria ceased to exist as an Egyptian outpost in 1889. Important settlements in Equatoria included Lado, Gondokoro, Dufile and Wadelai. In 1947, British hopes to join the southern part of Sudan with Uganda were dashed by the Juba Conference, to unify northern and southern Sudan.

Republic of Sudan
The region has been negatively affected by two civil wars since before Sudanese independence, resulting in serious neglect, lack of infrastructural development, and major destruction and displacement. More than 2.5 million people have been killed, and more than five million have become externally displaced while others have been internally displaced, becoming refugees as a result of the civil war and war-related impacts.

First civil war

In 1955, four months before Sudan achieved independence, the First Sudanese Civil War started, with aims of achieving representation and more regional autonomy. For seventeen years, the Sudanese government fought the Anyanya rebel army. In 1971, former army Lt. Joseph Lagu gathered all the guerilla bands under his South Sudan Liberation Movement (SSLM). This was the first time in the history of the war that the separatist movement had a unified command structure to fulfill the objectives of secession and the formation of an independent state in South Sudan.

It was also the first organization that could claim to speak for, and negotiate on behalf of, the entire south. Mediation between the World Council of Churches (WCC) and the All Africa Conference of Churches (AACC) eventually led to the signing of the Addis Ababa Agreement in 1972, which established the Southern Sudan Autonomous Region.

Second civil war

In 1983, President of Sudan Gaafar Nimeiry declared all Sudan an Islamic state under Shari'a law, including the non-Islamic majority southern region. The Southern Sudan Autonomous Region was abolished on 5 June 1983, ending the Addis Ababa Agreement. In direct response to this, the Sudan People's Liberation Army/Movement (SPLA/M) was formed under the leadership of John Garang, and the Second Sudanese Civil War erupted. Several factions split from the SPLA often along ethnic lines and were funded and armed by Khartoum, with the most notable being the SPLA-Nasir in 1991 led by Riek Machar.

As a result of the infighting, more southerners died at each other's hands than were killed by northerners during the war. In the Bor massacre of 1991, an estimated 2000 civilians were killed by SPLA-Nasir and armed Nuer civilians and another estimated 25,000 died from the resulting famine in the following years. This war lasted for twenty-two years (until 2005), becoming the longest civil war in Africa.

In 2005,  Comprehensive Peace Agreement, mediated by the Intergovernmental Authority on Development (IGAD), as well as IGAD-Partners, a consortium of donor countries, was signed in Nairobi and autonomous Government of Southern Sudan was formed. This agreement lasted until 2011, when South Sudan declared independence.

Independence referendum 

From 9–15 January 2011 people from South Sudan voted on whether they should break away from Sudan and declare independence. On 30 January 2011, the results had shown that 98.83% of the population had voted for independence from Sudan.

At midnight on 9 July 2011, South Sudan became an independent country under the name Republic of South Sudan. On 14 July 2011, South Sudan became the 193rd member state of the United Nations. On 28 July 2011, South Sudan joined the African Union as its 54th member state.

Certain disputes still remain with Sudan, such as sharing of the oil revenues, as an estimated 80% of the oil in both Sudans is from South Sudan, which would represent amazing economic potential for one of the world's most deprived areas. The region of Abyei still remains disputed and despite attempts to hold a separate referendum to decide on ownership, a number of issues delayed and ultimately cancelled an official referendum. In July 2011, following a UNSC resolution, Ethiopian peacekeepers began entering the area in order to prevent the military forces of Sudan and South Sudan from attempting to seize control of the area.

Independence

Heglig Crisis

In March 2012, the Sudanese Air Force bombed areas of the South Sudanese state of Unity, near the border of the Sudanese province of South Kordofan. South Sudanese forces responded by seizing the Heglig oil field on April 10. Sudanese troops launched a counter offensive and forced the South Sudanese Army to withdraw nine days later. On 20 April, South Sudan announced it had begun a phased withdrawal from Heglig, while Sudan claimed it took it by force. Afterwards, Sudanese president Omar al-Bashir held a victory rally in Khartoum.

At least one South Sudanese soldier was killed and two wounded in the attack.

The two parties recommenced negotiations in June 2012 under mediation by the African Union's envoy Thabo Mbeki.

On 27 September, Sudanese President Omar al-Bashir and South Sudanese President Salva Kiir signed eight agreements in Addis Ababa, Ethiopia, which led the way to resume important oil exports and create a  demilitarised zone along their border. In addition, the agreements include an understanding on the parameters to follow in regards to demarcating their border, an economic-cooperation agreement and a deal to protect each other's citizens. Certain issues remain unsolved and future talks are scheduled to resolve them. At the same time as the ongoing General debate of the sixty-seventh session of the United Nations General Assembly on the same day, South Sudan was scheduled to speak. Vice President Riek Machar outlined what agreements were signed, but lamented the lack of a resolution on Abyei.

In mid-March 2013, both countries began to withdraw their forces from the border area in a bid to create a demilitarised buffer zone and resume South Sudanese oil production for export through Sudan. In early April South Sudanese oil started to flow through pipelines in Sudan again. Though Sudanese President Omar al-Bashir threatened to cut oil transit through his country from South Sudan, South Sudanese President Salvar Kiir accused him of mobilising for war and said that he would not go to war over the oil transit issue.

South Kordofan conflict

On 6 June 2011 armed conflict broke out between the forces of Northern and Southern Sudan, ahead of the scheduled independence of the South on 9 July.  This followed an agreement for both sides to withdraw from Abyei.

By late June, several international interlocutors including the United Nations advanced a proposal to base 4,200 Ethiopian soldiers in Abyei to serve as peacekeepers.

Tribal conflict

In the SPLA/M's attempt to disarm rebellions among the Shilluk and Murle, they burned scores of villages, raped hundreds of women and girls and killed an untold number of civilians. Civilians alleging torture claim fingernails been torn out, burning plastic bags dripped on children to make their parents hand over weapons and villagers burned alive in their huts if rebels were suspected of spending the night there. In May 2011, the SPLA allegedly set fire to over 7,000 homes in Unity State. The UN reports many of these violations and the frustrated director of one Juba-based international aid agency calls them "human rights abuses off the Richter scale".

In 2010, the CIA issued a warning that "over the next five years,...a new mass killing or genocide is most likely to occur in southern Sudan." Inter-ethnic fighting intensified in 2011 in Jonglei state between the Nuer White Army of the Lou Nuer and the Murle. The White Army warned it would also fight South Sudanese and UN forces. The White Army released a statement, to "wipe out the entire Murle tribe on the face of the earth as the only solution to guarantee long-term security of Nuer’s cattle." Activists, including Minority Rights Group International, warn of genocide in the current Jonglei conflict.

Civil War

At independence, South Sudan was at war with at least seven armed groups. According to UN figures, the various conflicts affected nine of its ten states, with tens of thousands displaced. Joseph Kony's Lord's Resistance Army (LRA) also operates in a wide area that includes South Sudan. The fighters accuse the government of plotting to stay in power indefinitely, not fairly representing and supporting all tribal groups while neglecting development in rural areas.

President Salva Kiir alleged that on 14 December 2013, a (largely Nuer) faction of the Sudan People's Liberation Army loyal to former vice president Riek Machar attempted a coup d'état and that the attempt was put down the next day. However, fighting broke out, igniting the South Sudanese Civil War. Machar denied trying to start a coup and fled, calling for Kiir to resign. Ugandan troops were deployed to fight on the side of the Kiir. The United Nations has peacekeepers in the country as part of the United Nations Mission in South Sudan (UNMISS). In January 2014 the first ceasefire agreement was reached. Fighting still continued and would be followed by several more ceasefire agreements. Negotiations were mediated by "IGAD +" (which includes the eight regional nations as well as the African Union, United Nations, China, the EU, USA, UK and Norway). Following a ceasefire agreement in August 2015, known as the "Compromise Peace Agreement", Machar returned to Juba and was sworn in as vice-president. Following a second breakout of violence in Juba, Machar was replaced as vice-president and he fled to Sudan and the conflict erupted again. Rebel in-fighting has become of major part of the conflict. Rivalry among Dinka factions led by the President and Malong Awan have also led to fighting. In August 2018, another power sharing agreement came into effect.

There were ethnic undertones between the Dinka and Nuer in the fighting. About 400,000 people are estimated to have been killed in the war, including notable atrocities such as the 2014 Bentiu massacre. More than 4 million people have been displaced, with about 1.8 million of those internally displaced, and about 2.5 million having fled to neighboring countries, especially Uganda and Sudan.

See also

History of Sudan
Politics of South Sudan
List of presidents of South Sudan
National Archives of South Sudan

General:
History of Africa

References

Further reading